Jan Wojciechowski (7 October 1904 – 2 May 1986) was a Polish footballer. He played in two matches for the Poland national football team from 1928 to 1930.

References

External links
 

1904 births
1986 deaths
Polish footballers
Poland international footballers
Place of birth missing
Association footballers not categorized by position